Seringia arborescens is a shrub or small tree growing in moist eucalyptus forest, north of Ulladulla in New South Wales and extending up to the state of Queensland.

Growing up to 8 metres tall, this plant is not commonly seen, but it has a relatively large range of distribution on the east coast. There appears to be no common name.

Leaves are soft, mostly 5 to 15 cm long, 1.5 to 6 cm wide. Whitish cream with rusty hairs under the leaf and small branchlets. Greenish white flowers appear on cymes.  The fruit is a capsule covered in soft hairs, around 10 mm in diameter.

References

arborescens
Byttnerioideae
Trees of Australia
Flora of New South Wales
Flora of Queensland